Chris Manchester (born 28 June 1973) is a former speedway rider from the United States.

Speedway career 
Manchester is a former North American Champion, winning the AMA National Speedway Championship in 1992. He also won the United States Champion in 2000 and 2005.

He rode in the top tier of British Speedway from 1994 until 2003, riding primarily for the Belle Vue Aces.

References 

1973 births
Living people
American speedway riders
Belle Vue Aces riders
Somerset Rebels riders